Salim Neisari was an Iranian Professor of Persian literature and a permanent member of Academy of Persian Language and Literature. He was born on 12 December 1920 in Tabriz, East Azerbaijan Province, Azerbaijan (Iran), Iran and died on 12 January 2019 in Paris, France. He authored the first books on teaching Persian to non-Persian speakers.

Early life and educations
Salim Neisari was born on 12 December 1920 in Tabriz, East Azerbaijan Province, Azerbaijan (Iran), Iran. After completing his primary education there, he entered the training college of Tabriz and graduated with a first degree, then he went to Tehran and entered the University of Tehran. In 1942, He received a Bachelor's degree in Persian literature from University of Tehran. In 1950, After completing his studies in Persian literature, he went to Europe and continued his studies at the University of London. He received a master's degree in Linguistics from the University of London. After that he went to United States and received his doctorate in Philosophy from Indiana University.

Careers
In 1942, Salim Nisari was employed by the Ministry of Culture and Islamic Guidance and held positions such as Secretary of the Ministry of Culture, Head of the Ministry's Office, Ministerial Inspector and Advisor to the Minister of Culture.

In 1944, He assumed the deputy in Faculty of Literature in Shiraz University.

In 1955, He served as elected associate professor in Kharazmi University (at that time it was called High Training College of Tehran). Then in 1956 he served as associate professor there.

In 1957, Salim Nisari was recruited by the UNESCO Central Secretariat in Paris and was appointed as Head of the UNESCO Technical Assistance Office. On this position, due to a mission from UNESCO's General Director, he traveled to countries on North Africa and Middle East and Southwest Asia for guidance on how UNESCO's scientific and cultural assistance program should be improved.

In 1965, after completing his UNESCO mission and returning to Iran, He was appointed as General Director of Cultural Relations at the Ministry of Education.

In 1967, he became a professor and transferred to the Faculty of Educational Sciences of the University of Tehran.

In 1977, Neisari traveled to Turkey on a mission from the University of Tehran and the Ministry of Culture and Arts with the role of Cultural Advisor, and returned to Iran in 1979 after the mission ended.

Eventually in 1980, Salim Neisari retired at his own request after 38 years of service.

In 2003, He became a permanent member of the Academy of Persian Language and Literature.

Death
Salim Neisari died on 12 January 2019 in Paris, France at age 98 due to old age and stomach disease. Salim Nisari's body after moving from Paris to Tehran, buried at Namavaran Segment of Behesht-e Zahra, Tehran, Iran.

Bibliography
 Tarikhe Adabiate Iran Bad az Eslam, title means: History of Iranian Literature After Islam, 1947
 Tarikhe Adabiate Iran, title means: History of Iranian Literature, 1949
 Tambrhaye Iran, title means: Iran stamps, 1961
 Koliate Raveshe Tadris dar Dabirestan, title means: General Teaching Method in High School, 1965
 Osoole Tamrine Dabiri va Koliate Raveshe Tadris dar Dabirestan, title means: Principles of Teachering Practice and General Teaching Method in High School, 1965
 Tadrise Zabane Farsi dar Dabestan ya Amouzeshe Honarhaye Zaban, title means: Teaching Persian language in elementary school or language arts education, 1965
 Nemoonehayi az Asare Javidane Shere Farsi, title means: Examples of eternal works of Persian poetry, 1971
 Ghazalhaye Hafez, title means: Hafez sonnets, 1974
 Moghaddameyi bar Tadvine Ghazalhaye Hafez, title means: Introduction to the compilation of Hafez's sonnets, 1988
 Daftare Digarsaniha dar Ghazalhaye Hafez, title means: The book of others like in Hafez's sonnets, 1994
 Dastoure Khatte Farsi: Pajouheshi Darbareye Peyvastegie Khatte Farsi ba Zabane Farsi, title means: Persian Script Grammar, A Study of the Relationship between Persian Script and Persian Language, 1995
 Divane Hafez: Bar Asase Noskhehaye Khattie Sadeye Nohom, title means: The Divan of Hafez: Based on manuscripts of the ninth century, 1998
 Divane Hafez ba Miniatorhayi az Ostad Farshchian, title means: The Divan of Hafez with miniatures by Master Farshchian, 2003
 Darse Enshaye Farsi, title means: Persian essay lesson
 Ketabe Avvale Farsi: Dara va Sara ba Doostan, title means: First Book of Persian Primary School (Dara and Sarah with Friends)
 Farsi Yad Begirid, title means: Learn Persian
 Rahnamaye Mikalemeye Engelisi va Farsi, title means: English and Persian Conversation Guide
 Bargozideyi az Ghazalhaye Hafez, title means: A selection of Hafez sonnets
 Bargozideyi az Ghazalhaye Saadi, title means: A selection of Saadi sonnets

Awards
 Order of Persian Politeness (1st Order), March 2, 2010
 A top-notch badge of Hafez Researcher, 2008

See also
 Abdolmohammad Ayati
 Mohammad-Taqi Bahar
 Ali-Akbar Dehkhoda
 Badiozzaman Forouzanfar
 Houshang Moradi Kermani
 Manouchehr Sotoudeh

References

External links
 Picture Report: Funeral ceremony of Salim Neisari
 Picture Report: Funeral of Salim Neisari
 Neisari's Books on Gisoom
 Salim Neisari on Tasnim
 Neisari's Books on Adineh

1920 births
2019 deaths
Iranian male writers
People from Tabriz
Persian-language writers
Burials at Behesht-e Zahra
Members of the Academy of Persian Language and Literature
Recipients of the Order of Persian Politeness
Indiana University alumni
University of Tehran alumni
Alumni of the University of London
Iranian expatriates in the United States
Iranian expatriates in the United Kingdom
Iranian expatriates in France